Aleke Joy Tsoubanos (born April 27, 1982) is an American former professional tennis player.

Tsoubanos, the daughter of Greek-born parents, is originally from St. Louis and played collegiate tennis for Vanderbilt University. She was a member of the Vanderbilt team which finished runner-up in the 2001 NCAA Championships and was a three-time ITA doubles All-American.

Graduating from Vanderbilt University in 2004, Tsoubanos competed on the professional tour until 2007, reaching career-high rankings of 431 in singles and 126 in doubles. She was a WTA Tour doubles quarterfinalist at Rabat and Quebec City in 2006. Her four titles on the ITF Women's Circuit all came as a doubles player.

In 2020, she was named as the new head coach of women's tennis at Vanderbilt University, where she had served as an assistant coach for the previous 13 years.

ITF finals

Doubles: 12 (4–8)

References

External links
 
 

1982 births
Living people
American female tennis players
Vanderbilt Commodores women's tennis players
Vanderbilt Commodores women's tennis coaches
American tennis coaches
Tennis people from Missouri
Sportspeople from St. Louis County, Missouri
American people of Greek descent